Geetanjali Singh is an Indian film and television actress, best known for her television shows, Tumhari Paakhi,  Million Dollar Girl, and Dil Toh Happy Hai Ji. 
She has also been featured in major ad campaigns with the brands such as Amazon, Nestle, Nikon, AJIO, Flipkart, and Cox & Kings.
Her feature film Falsafa: The Other Side was released in 2019.

Career
Singh's breakthrough role was in the drama, Tumhari Paakhi (2013–2014), playing the part of Deepika in all 269 episodes of the show. In 2019, she starred in the Bollywood film, Falsafa: The Other Side, opposite Manit Joura and Sumit Gulati. She has also appeared in the TV series, Million Dollar Girl (2014–2015) and Dil Toh Happy Hai Ji (2019), as well as television commercials.

Television

References

External links

 
 
 10 year Challenge
Geetanjali Singh - Struggle has been my best teacher
 
 

Indian television actresses
People from Gorakhpur
Year of birth missing (living people)
Living people
21st-century Indian actresses